Ackworth may refer to:

 Ackworth, West Yorkshire, England
 Ackworth, Iowa, US

See also 

 Acworth (disambiguation)